The 2018 Barrie municipal election was held on October 22, 2018, to elect a Mayor and 10 city councillors of the city of Barrie, Ontario, Canada. School trustees of the English-language Simcoe County District and Simcoe Muskoka Catholic District School Boards and the French-language Conseil scolaire Viamonde and Conseil scolaire catholique MonAvenir were also elected to represent the 10 wards of Barrie.

The election was held in conjunction with those held other municipalities of Ontario. In the mayoral race, incumbent mayor Jeff Lehman was re-elected with 90.97% of the popular vote. There were 38 candidates running for 10 city councillor positions – three councillors were re-elected, one was acclaimed, and six wards saw new councillors.

Voter turnout was at an all-time low at 29.65% of registered voters. Turnout would later increase in 2022 up to 30.45%.

Results 

The results of the election are listed below. Individuals who also won their seat in the last elections of 2014 are denoted as incumbents.

Mayor 

There were two candidates for Mayor of Barrie: perennial candidate Ram Faerber and incumbent Jeff Lehman. The mayoral election had 11 declined ballots.

Candidate information:
 Ram Faerber was the owner of a recycling business. He was previously a mayoral candidate in 2014 and unsuccessfully ran for Member of Parliament of Barrie—Springwater—Oro-Medonte in the 2015 Canadian federal election and Member of Provincial Parliament of Barrie—Springwater—Oro-Medonte in the 2018 Ontario general election as an independent politician. If elected, he hoped to focus on homelessness, freeze municipal tax increases, and reducing drug addiction.
 Jeff Lehman was the incumbent Mayor of Barrie, first elected in 2010 and seeking a third term. He announced his intentions to run in March, campaigning for a "strong economy, strong society and strong neighbourhoods" for the city.

City Council elections 

Each of Barrie's 10 wards had elected a councillor to the Barrie City Council. Incumbent Sergio Morales was acclaimed as councillor for Ward 9, something that only happened twice in the last 20 years.

School board trustee elections 

Seven candidates were elected members of four different school boards across Simcoe County and the Golden Horseshoe.

Ward 3 by-election 

A by-election was held on February 24, 2020, in Ward 3 to fill the vacancy of Doug Shipley, who was elected to the House of Commons. Ann-Marie Kungl, who ran unsuccessfully in Ward 1 in 2018, was elected councillor.

The by-election also saw the return of Ram Faerber, Tanya Saari, and Peter Silveira, who ran for mayor, Ward 3, and Ward 5, respectively, in 2018.

References

External links 
 City of Barrie: Government & News

Barrie
Municipal government of Barrie